The Renovators is an Australian competitive reality renovation show that premiered on Network Ten on 24 July 2011. The basic premise consists of 26 contestants who initially compete to become the head renovator of six run-down houses in the suburbs of Sydney, with challenges and eliminations taking place whilst the renovations are in progress. The last remaining contestant responsible for the property that has made the most profit when sold at auction wins the series.

Network Ten announced in August 2011 that it had commissioned a second season of the series, but indicated that it would modify the program's format to address poor ratings, but as of 2023, no second season has been produced.

Contestants

There are 26 contestants in this season, competing initially as 26 individuals, then as 6 teams of 4.

Colour Key

Challenge Elimination Chart
Colour Key

In Week 10, all teams were announced cash prize winners based on their bathrooms. The 60's Suburban came in 1st, with a $30 000 cash prize, and The Inner City Terrace and The Half Done House coming 2nd and 3rd, and receiving $20 000 and $15 000 respectively. All other teams received $10 000

 This money was won on a weekly challenge.

Ratings
 Colour key:
  – Highest rating during the series
  – Lowest rating during the series
  – Finals week

International

References

External links
The Fibro Cottage – Auction Thu, 29th Sep 2011 8:00PM

Network 10 original programming
2011 Australian television series debuts
2011 Australian television series endings
2010s Australian reality television series
Home renovation television series
English-language television shows